This is a list of Philippine Basketball Association seasons.

List of seasons
Each season is composed of 2 or more conferences; in the PBA where teams are owned by corporations and do not reside in a geographical area, "conferences" are tournaments held during a season.

Winning a conference is considered a greater honor than having the best record in the season; the most prestigious conference is the All-Filipino Cup. If a team wins all three conferences in a single season from 1975–2003 and since 2010, winning three consecutive championships, the team is said to have won the "Grand Slam" and is a greatest honor a team can achieve in a single season. Four teams in five different seasons have completed this achievement. During 2004–2010, when the league shifted into a two-conference format, three consecutive championships contribute into a Grand Slam. However, this feat was not accomplished.

Notes
In 1981, only two conferences were held as the Philippines was the host of the 1981 Southeast Asian Games.
In 1998, four conferences were held to celebrate the 100th anniversary of the Philippine Declaration of Independence. The group stage results of the third conference (1998 PBA Centennial Cup) were carried over to the fourth (1998 PBA Governors' Cup).
In 2004, the league shifted to an October–June two-conference calendar from a January–December three-conference calendar to allow players to participate in FIBA tournaments. As a result, the 2004 PBA Fiesta Conference was held to smoothen the transition. 
In 2020, only one conference was held due to the effects of the COVID-19 pandemic in the Philippines.
In 2021, two conferences were played due to the effects of the COVID-19 pandemic in the Philippines.

References
Past PBA seasons